Olena Ihorivna Vitrychenko (born 25 November 1976), also known as Elena Vitrichenko, is an Individual Ukrainian Rhythmic Gymnast. She is the 1996 Olympics bronze medalist, the 1997 World All-around champion and 1997 European All-around champion.

Career 
Olena Vitrychenko was introduced to the sport in 1980 when she was four years old by her mother, Nina, herself a former rhythmic gymnast. Her mother coached her at the Deryuguina School in Kiev.

Vitrychenko made her international debut in 1986. At the 1992 European Championships in Stuttgart, Germany, she won a bronze medal as a member of the Ukrainian group. At the 1994 World Championships in Paris, she placed third in the hoop event final behind teammate, Ekaterina Serebrianskaya, and the Belarusian Larissa Lukyanenko who were both tied for the gold (9.875); but an upgraded score (9.825 to 9.875) for then Bulgarian World champion Maria Petrova knocked Vitrichenko out of the bronze medal position into fourth.

At the 1996 Atlanta Olympics, Vitrychenko seemed to be a contender for the gold medal, having placed first after preliminaries and second after the semi-finals. Despite a clean all-around performance in the final, she was given scores in the 9.8 range (the highest score received in the rope event was 9.866). She placed second behind teammate Ekaterina Serebrianskaya after the first rotation on the rope, but her ball routine score of 9.800 threw her out of the gold medal hunt, and she had to fight for the bronze with Russian rival Amina Zaripova. She was able to take the bronze medal due to Zaripova's mishandling of the ribbon, stepping on it before her final toss. Vitrichenko would later say that she felt that she was robbed of the gold. In the following year she became both the World and the European All-Around champion.

At the peak of a long and well-publicized feud with the head of the Ukrainian Rhythmic Gymnastics Federation, Vitrychenko was placed 19th at the 2000 European Championships in Zaragoza, Spain, and withdrew in protest. After an official evaluation of videotapes determined that certain judges had clearly discriminated against Vitrichenko, the FIG sanctioned the following judges: Natalia Stepanova (Belarus), Gabriele Stummer (Austria), Galina Marjina (Latvia), Ursula Sohlenkamp (Germany), Natalia Lashtsinkaya (Russia), and Ukrainian Irina Diriugina. Although Madame Abruzzini, the then-president of the Rhythmic Gymnastics Technical Committee, wanted more severe punishment, such as life suspension, the judges were suspended for one year and excluded from a judging course in Rome. Their federations were forced to select other judges for the Sydney Olympics who met the requirements of FIG. The other 26 judges that were at Zaragoza received warnings and were not allowed to judge in Sydney. It was the first time in the sport's history that severe inappropriate behavior was proven and penalized.

After the Europeans, Vitrychenko's own federation tried to deny her a spot on the Ukrainian Olympic team in 2000. She appealed to the International Olympic Committee who overturned the decision, and awarded her a spot on the team. She performed well at the Olympics, finishing in fourth place behind Alina Kabaeva.

Vitrychenko retired from the sport after the 2000 Sydney Olympics, saying that the omnipresent judging politics would prevent her from achieving further success. She stated that she is not embittered by her controversial placings: "The most important thing that I have learned in elite sports is to experience other people's victories and to forgive people.". Over the course of her career, she won a total of nine World titles and ten European titles.

Vitrychenko coached rhythmic gymnastics in Spain for ten years. In March 2013, she began coaching at the Illinois Rhythmic Gymnastic Center.

Olena Vitrychenko opened up her own club Vitrychenko Academy on the Chicago Northshore in November 2014. More information about her club can be found at www.vitrychenkoacademy.com

Routine music information

Detailed Olympic results

References

External links
 
 
 
 

1976 births
Living people
Ukrainian rhythmic gymnasts
Deriugins Gymnasts
Sportspeople from Odesa
Olympic gymnasts of Ukraine
Gymnasts at the 1996 Summer Olympics
Gymnasts at the 2000 Summer Olympics
Olympic medalists in gymnastics
Medalists at the 1996 Summer Olympics
Medalists at the Rhythmic Gymnastics World Championships
Medalists at the Rhythmic Gymnastics European Championships
Olympic bronze medalists for Ukraine
Universiade medalists in gymnastics
Universiade gold medalists for Ukraine
Universiade bronze medalists for Ukraine
Goodwill Games medalists in gymnastics
Medalists at the 1997 Summer Universiade
Competitors at the 1998 Goodwill Games